Dauchy is a surname. Notable people with the surname include:

 Krys Dauchy (born 1970), American cyclist
 Marie Dauchy (born 1987), French politician

See also
 Duchy